The women's 100 metres hurdles at the 2010 European Athletics Championships was held at the Estadi Olímpic Lluís Companys on 30 and 31 July.

Medalists

Records

Schedule

Results

Round 1
First 3 in each heat and 4 best performers advance to the Semifinals.

Heat 1

Heat 2

Heat 3

Heat 4

Summary

Semifinals
First 3 in each heat and 2 best performers advance to the Final.

Semifinal 1

Semifinal 2

Summary

Final

References
 Round 1 results
 Semifinal results
 Final results

Hurdles 100
Sprint hurdles at the European Athletics Championships
2010 in women's athletics